La Esperanza Airport  is an airstrip located along the Apere River in the Beni Department of Bolivia.

See also

Transport in Bolivia
List of airports in Bolivia

References

External links 
OpenStreetMap - La Esperanza
OurAirports - La Esperanza

Airports in Santa Cruz Department (Bolivia)